George Mulim Rebello (born 18 August 1966) is a Brazilian windsurfer. He competed at the 1988 Summer Olympics and the 1992 Summer Olympics.

References

External links
 
 

1966 births
Living people
Brazilian windsurfers
Brazilian male sailors (sport)
Olympic sailors of Brazil
Sailors at the 1988 Summer Olympics – Division II
Sailors at the 1992 Summer Olympics – Lechner A-390
People from Macaé
Sportspeople from Rio de Janeiro (state)